Webbs Creek Ferry is a cable ferry across the Hawkesbury River in New South Wales, Australia. The ferry operates from the community of Wisemans Ferry, to a point up-stream of the Hawkesbury River's confluence with the Macdonald River, thus connecting with St Albans Road that follows the west bank of the Macdonald River.

The ferry is operated by a private sector operator under contract to Transport for NSW and is free of tolls. The ferry operates on demand 24 hours a day, 7 days a week, but is closed for maintenance on the first Tuesday of each month from 0930 to 1200

The Webbs Creek Ferry is one of two cable ferry crossings at Wisemans Ferry, the other being the eponymous Wisemans Ferry, which crosses the Hawkesbury River to a point downstream of the confluence with the Macdonald River. Two other such ferries cross the Hawkesbury River proper, these being the Sackville Ferry and the Lower Portland Ferry, whilst a fifth ferry, the Berowra Waters Ferry, crosses a side-arm of the river.

See also
 Mortlake Ferry
 Webbs Creek

References

External links
 RMS vehicle ferry operation information.

Hawkesbury River
Ferries of New South Wales
Ferry transport in Sydney
Cable ferries in Australia